El Sol de América C.A. (also known as Sol América) was a Venezuelan airline headquartered in Caracas. It operated domestic charter services. Its bases were at Simón Bolívar International Airport and Josefa Camejo International Airport.

History
The airline was established and started operations on September 12, 1980 as an air taxi.

On April 8, 2008, it began regular operations between Caracas and Maracaibo to alleviate the deficit on this route, the one with the highest demand in Venezuela after Porlamar. Its intention was to expand in Latin America and in 2011, be the largest airline in Venezuela.

In July 2008, it passed into the hands of a new administration with a view to converting Sol America into an airline with scheduled and non-scheduled flights for passengers and national and international cargo, as well as offering charter operations, all this with the incorporation of Boeing 737-200 aircraft. In order to offer a better product and operate medium-range routes such as Cancun, Cuba, Dominican Republic, Colombia, among others. At the beginning of 2010, the airline ceased its commercial operations for unknown reasons and retired its fleet.

Destinations
As of January 2005, Sol América operated services to destinations including 

Oranjestad (Queen Beatrix International Airport)

Willemstad (Curaçao International Airport)

Caracas (Simón Bolívar International Airport) Hub
Coche Island (Andrés Miguel Salazar Marcano Airport)
Higuerote (Higuerote Airport)
Las Piedras (Josefa Camejo International Airport) Hub
Los Roques (Los Roques Airport)
Porlamar (Santiago Mariño Caribbean International Airport)
Valencia (Arturo Michelena International Airport)

Fleet
Sol América consisted of the following aircraft as of November 2008:

2 Boeing 737-200

Sol America formerly operated the following aircraft:

1 Beechcraft 65
1 Beechcraft 1900C
3 British Aerospace Jetstream 31
2 Britten-Norman Trislander
1 Cessna 206
1 Cessna 310
1 Dornier Do-28
1 Douglas DC-3
3 Let L-410 Turbolet
1 Piper PA-32R

See also
List of defunct airlines of Venezuela

References

External links
Official Website

Defunct airlines of Venezuela
Airlines established in 1980
Venezuelan companies established in 1980
Airlines disestablished in 2010
2014 disestablishments in Venezuela
Defunct companies of Venezuela